Marina di Cecina is a town in Tuscany, central Italy, administratively a frazione of the comune of Cecina, province of Livorno.

References

Bibliography 
 

Frazioni of the Province of Livorno
Cecina, Tuscany